Pak Mong is a village on Lantau Island, Hong Kong. The village was founded by Hakka settlers during the Ming period in the 16th and 17th centuries, and prospered in the trade from Canton to Cheung Chau. Ferries from Castle Peak (old Tuen Mun) to Pak Mong to Mui Wo to Cheung Chau facilitating the trade. The kai-to ferry service between Tuen Mun and Pak Mong only terminating in 1986.

Administration
Pak Mong is a recognized village under the New Territories Small House Policy.

Features
The village is at the start of the Hong Kong Olympic Trail (and also connects with the Islands Nature Heritage Trail), a 5.6 km long "Olympic Route" connecting to Mui Wo that was opened in celebration of Hong Kong's hosting of the equestrian events in the July 2008 Olympics.

A Republican-era watchtower in Pak Mong is listed as a Grade II Historic Building.

The entrance gate of the village is a Grade III Historic Building.

There is an abandoned village school, built in 1955, at its peak in 1975 it had around 30 children. Following abandonment of agriculture and depopulation it was closed down in 1985.

References

External links

 Delineation of area of existing village Pak Mong (Mui Wo) for election of resident representative (2019 to 2022)
 History of Pak Mong on Lantau

Villages in Islands District, Hong Kong
Lantau Island